My Little Airport is a Hong Kong-based indie pop band. Their English lyrics are marked by spelling, grammar, and rhythm inflected by Hong Kong English. The band's lyrics and music are written by Ah P (Lam Pang) and sung by Nicole (Nicole Au Kin-ying). The duo occasionally invite friends (Ah Suet, who speaks French, for instance) and relatives (Nicole's younger sister) to participate in their albums and shows. They established Harbour Records with four other indie bands from Hong Kong, and on it released their 2004 debut album The OK Thing to Do on Sunday Afternoon Is to Toddle in the Zoo. In 2006 they joined Elefant Records, hoping to gain distribution beyond Hong Kong's small indie fanbase.

Career
The band had its start while the two were journalism students at Hong Kong Shue Yan College (now Hong Kong Shue Yan University), writing songs in both English and Cantonese. They intended to put into use lessons learnt in class, and as a result this is why many of their songs have been said to follow the Five Ws: "Who?", "What?", "Where?", "When?", "Why?" as journalistic works typically do. The duo is also notable for their quirky song titles, often addressed to friends, such as "leo, are you still jumping out of windows in expensive clothes?", "victor, fly me to stafford", or addressed to celebrities, such as "Gigi Leung is dead", "Faye Wong, about your eyebrows".

In 2009, the group started writing politically themed songs such as "divvying up Stephen Lam's $300000 salary" and "Donald Tsang, please die". The latter song was written after Tsang suggested that the Tiananmen Square protests of 1989 were insignificant compared to China's current economic power (such social/political themes had already been extensively explored by Ah P with Forever Tarkovsky Club, a side project he had set up with Pixeltoy's Ho Shan between 2007 and 2009).

A fourth album entitled poetics – something between montparnasse and mongkok was released on 23 November 2009, which contains many of those politically charged songs. A fifth album entitled Hong Kong is one big shopping mall was released on 26 August 2011, which received numerous awards (including the title of third best album in Cantonese 2011, by Sina Weibo). In October 2012, the band released their sixth album, lonely friday, on the Harbour Records label.

On 30 November 2011, Hong Kong arts and culture magazine Muse named my little airport Hong Kong's 'Next Big Thing' cultural heroes of 2011. The song "you don't want to be my girlfriend, phoebe" was covered by the Scottish indie band, BMX Bandits.

Discography

Studio records

Singles
2004 – Radio Singles
come out and play
tim, do you really wanna make a film?
in the name of amk
2005 – Radio Singles
草地音樂合輯
在動物園散步才是正經事
victor, fly me to stafford
i don't know how to download good av like iris does
2005 – CD Singles 
when i listen to the field mice
gigi leung is dead
2021
那陣時不知道 (I didn’t know at that time)
因講了出來 (If i let it out)
散步之年 (year of strolling)
每次你走的時分 (every time you left)
2022
LUNCH
呕吐（nausea)
你把我的 (you’ve given my)

References

External links
 my little airport's Official Site
 my little airport's Official Page at Elefant Records
 Harbour Records' Official Site
review of my little airport at Timeout.com
Bitetone Presents Our 2011 35 Best Chinese Records at Bitetone.com
Bitetone Presents 2012 Best 20 records from China, HK and Taiwan. at Bitetone.com

Cantopop musical groups
Chinese indie rock groups
Musical groups established in 2001
Elefant Records artists